Isa Boletini (15 January 186423 or 24 January 1916) was an Albanian revolutionary commander and politician and rilindas from Kosovo.

As a young man, he joined the Albanian nationalist League of Prizren and participated in a battle against Ottoman forces. After this, he was temporarily loyal to the Ottoman sultan and built a power base in the Mitrovica area. He served as the commander of Ottoman palace guards in Istanbul for four years (1902–06), returning with a land grant, officer rank and the command of the local militia. In 1909, he and other Kosovo Albanian chieftains, revolted against the Young Turk imposition of taxes on Muslims. Next, he took an important role in the 1910 revolt against Ottoman rule, the Albanian revolt of 1912, then fought against the Montenegrin and Serbian armies in Kosovo. He participated in the Albanian Declaration of Independence in Vlorë (November 1912) and was then assigned as a diplomatic agent to the British (1913), and bodyguard of Prince William of Albania (1914). He was killed during a shoot-out in Podgorica under unclear circumstances in January 1916.

Biography

Life 

Isa Boletini was born in the village of Boletin near Mitroviça (Mitrovica), Ottoman Empire.  His family had migrated to Boletin from the village of Isniq near Deçan, due to a blood feud (gjakmarrja) though they ultimately hailed from Shala, in northern Albania. They adopted the surname Boletini ("of Boletin"). The Shala were the poorest tribe of Albania with a small exception of around 400 families who lived in Isniq. They were in conflict with the Gashi tribe until they made peace in August 1879 on the sultan's orders.

Family 

Boletini had several sons, who are mentioned in 1924 as living with their women and other relatives in Boletini's kulla (that had been destroyed by Ottoman artillery several times) near the Sokolica Monastery "as though feudal lords, frugally and ceremoniously, but with endlessly less authority". His son Mustafa was a rebel leader in the Balkan Wars. On 27 July 1936, his grandson, Ismet, was knife stabbed by two Albanian criminals while protecting his friends, three Serbs, in Kosovska Mitrovica. Dubious Source

Death 

There are different stories about his death in Podgorica on 23 or 24 January 1916:

Boletini became seriously ill while defending Scutari, and in order to not be taken by the Montenegrins he sought to ask for protection at the French consulate in Cetinje. He was arrested in the Cetinje Hotel and immediately interred in Nikšić, then in Podgorica. During the entering of the Austro-Hungarian army and chaos in Podgorica, the Montenegrin gendarmerie killed Boletini, his two sons, two grandsons, son-in-law, nephew and two loyal fellows, on the bridge over the Morača river on 23 January 1916. It was believed that he went to meet the Austro-Hungarian army. According to the Albanian newspapers, the unit of Montenegrin Gendarmerie that killed Boletini was under command of Savo Lazarević.
Historian Bogumil Hrabak mentioned that his death occurred "in the stir which he provoked with his threats that he would take over the city". 
Owen Pearson claims that on 24 January 1916 he was killed while "virtually a prisoner" in Podgorica, after a dispute provoked by the Montenegrins led to fighting in the town. He managed to kill eight before he died.
A Belgrade press claimed that upon the Austro-Hungarian occupation of Montenegro, when citizens were to hand over weapons to the authorities, Isa Boletini, his son and six friends refused, entered the town courtroom where people had gathered, and tried to encourage them to resist the occupation, then shot a Montenegrin writer and two police officers (panduri). A manhunt followed, in which Boletini was killed.

Career

1878–1907 
After the rise of the Albanian nationalist League of Prizren (1878), he, as a young man, took part in the Battle of Slivova against Ottoman forces on 22 April 1881. Boletini built a power base in his hometown and illegally seized property from fellow Muslims. By 1898–99, he received money for protecting the Serbian Orthodox community in the Mitrovica region, and was rewarded with a medal and supply of weapons by the Kingdom of Serbia. The Sokolica Monastery, located between Albanian villages, was protected by brothers Ahmed and Isa, who lived , respectively, from the monastery. It was stated in 1899, by Serbian consul in Pristina Svetislav Simić, that "not one Serb fell from his rifle, and where the power of his martini reached, the rayah was completely free from zulum". The time after 1900 was increasingly marked by ethnic tensions.

1908–1911 
During the Young Turk revolution (1908), a large gathering in Firzovik (Ferizaj) of local urban notables and Muslim clergy (ulema) backed restoration of the constitution while Boletini on the side of the chieftains viewed that position as disloyalty to the sultan. He withdrew his forces before a decision could be made realizing the weakness of his position. During the revolution, rumors of the time had it that Abdul Hamid II asked Boletini for assistance to disperse the Firzovik gathering. He was loyal to the sultan though in 1908 Boletini had given his initial support to the Young Turks and later fought against their government. Boletini was deputy of Kosovo in the Ottoman Assembly between 1908 and 1912.

The Committee of Union and Progress, within  a month of the restoration of the constitution, decided to address blood feuding matters in Kosovo, sentencing Albanians engaged in killings. Toward the end of 1908 aggressive measures was pushed by locals – Nexhip Draga and other notables in Kosovo viewed Boletini as a nuisance, threat and loyalist of sultan Abdulhamid II and lobbied the new Young Turk (CUP) government for his arrest and destruction of his kulla (tower house). Class differences of Draga, a landowner wanting law and order and Boletini, a chieftain preferring maintenance of old privileges and autonomy along with the disagreement in Firzovik about the restoration of the constitution resulted in the rift. Unable to convince CUP members in Mitrovica to take action, Draga traveled to Salonika and pleaded his case to the local CUP committee who approved and got the Ottoman government to act against Boletini. The Ottoman government needing a pretext for action sent an officer with some soldiers to serve a court order to Boletini for illegally receiving land from the sultan that previously belonged to a local named Haxhi Ali. Boletini scoffed at the charges, cursed the Young Turk revolution and threw the Ottoman authorities out. Ottoman forces arrived at his stronghold shortly after, resulting in an attack and fierce firefight with Boletini escaping with a small group of men and his kulla was razed to the ground. Local Ottoman authorities like the mutasarrif of İpek (Pejë) advised the Young Turk government against action on Boletini on grounds it could produce larger troubles for the state and instead advocated for a show of force to make local chieftains submit. After the events with Boletini, the Ottoman army then went throughout Kosovo and razed other kullas of several chieftains involved in the deruhdecilik (protection "racket") system.

During the 31 March Incident, Boletini along with several Kosovo Albanian chieftains offered the sultan military assistance. On 15 May 1909, the Young Turks, continuing their former policy of denying the Albanians national rights, sent a military expedition to the Kosovo Vilayet to stop the growth of hostile attitudes to the government and break resistance of the peasants, who refused to pay taxes which Istanbul had introduced. Cavid Pasha, the new commander of the division at Mitroviça, was ordered to carry out a succession of military operations against the Albanian mountaineers, in particular the capture of Boletini. The Young Turks expressed the view through their newspaper Tanin that most Albanians of the area had given their besa (pledge) not to go against the government apart from Boletini and a few supporters. Ottoman authorities placed a reward of 300 liras on Boletini for his capture. On account of the attempts of the authorities to collect taxes which hitherto had been paid almost entirely by the Christians, serious disturbances broke out among the warlike Muslim tribes of northern Albania. Boletini, a prominent leader often honoured by the Sultan, and other chiefs of Pejë and Yakova (Gjakovë), attacked the Ottoman army, and numerous fights led to much bloodshed, the Ottoman army also bombarding several villages. Boletini led fighting in Pristina, Prizren and elsewhere.

Boletini took an important role in the Albanian Revolt of 1910. Early in 1910, he visited the Albanian highlanders who had fled into Montenegro where they were given additional weapons by King Nikolla. In Kosovo at İpek, Boletini and the heads of twelve Albanian highland clans agreed for joint action against the Ottomans. Kosovo Albanians went on the offensive and with 2,000 men Boletini attacked Firzovik and Prizren. He resisted the Ottoman army at Crnoljeva (Caraleva) for two days. Boletini later escaped as the Ottomans put down the rebellion. In 1910, Nopcsa named him and the earlier Ali Pasha Draga the leading Albanian figures in Mitrovica. In 1910–11, the Montenegrin government encouraged northern Albanian tribes (Malissori) to revolt against the Ottoman Empire. Apart from the Catholic Malissori, also some Kosovo Albanian leaders were approached, among these were Boletini. Boletini intended to use Montenegro as a base for incursions into Ottoman Albania. At first, Montenegro ignored his presence, but on 15 June, after numerous protests from the Ottoman ambassador, escorted Boletini and his thirteen followers away from the Albanian border.

1912 

In the prelude to revolt, the Serbian government worked with some Albanian guerrilla bands to be in position of creating difficulties if the moment required it and to that end courted Boletini through the Serbian organization known as the Black Hand. On April 23, Hasan Prishtina's rebels revolted in the Highlands of Gjakova, which then spread. By 20 May, Boletini alongside other Albanian leaders were present at a meeting in Junik where a besa (pledge) was given to wage war on the Young Turk government through armed insurrection in Kosovo Vilayet. In springtime 1912, Boletini led a revolt in Kosovo, with surprising victories after victories against the Turks. During the 1912 uprising, while waiting for an Ottoman response to the demands of the rebels, Boletini and other leaders of the rebellion ordered their forces to advance toward Üsküb (modern Skopje) which was captured during August 12–15. Albanian irregulars then threatened to march on Bitola and Thessaloniki, and the Ottomans sent troops against the rebels, who retired to the mountains but continued to protest against the government, and in the whole region between İpek and Mitrovica they plundered military depots, opened prisons and collected taxes from the inhabitants for the Albanian chiefs.

On August 18, the moderate faction led by Prishtina managed to convince Boletini, and other leaders Idriz Seferi, Bajram Curri and Riza Bey Gjakova of the conservative group to accept the agreement with the Ottomans for Albanian sociopolitical and cultural rights. The Ottomans then agreed on concessions that promised autonomy for the Albanian-inhabited vilayets of Kosovo, Scutari, Yanina and part of Monastir (Bitola). On 18 August 1912, the Porte replied that it was ready to concede a series of economic, political, administrative and cultural rights, but no formal autonomy. The Albanian side accepted, abandoned further national claims, and had Boletini pacified and returned to his home. The Ottoman side accepted on 4 September. This created a virtually autonomous Albanian state. While Muslim Kosovo Albanians were pleased, the Balkan neighbours and Catholic Albanians were not. The Balkan states envisaged the partition of Albania between them, and thus hastened to precipitate war. Montenegro won over the Malissori, supporting an autonomous northern Albanian Catholic entity.

In August, Colonel Dragutin Dimitrijević "Apis", the head of the Serbian Black Hand organization, sent a letter requesting Boletini and his men to assist the Serbs in fighting the Ottomans. The Black Hand stimulated and encouraged the Kosovo Albanians in their revolt, promising them help; Colonel Apis visited northern Albania several times in order to get in touch with the leaders of the Albanian uprising, especially Boletini. Apis declared that the Serbs only wanted to liberate the Albanians from Ottoman subjection, and that the Serbs and Albanians both would benefit from liberating the country. Succeeding in persuading the Kosovo Albanians to fight against the Ottomans, however, Apis and his men committed political murders disguised as Albanians, and eventually the Montenegrin and Serbian armies massacred Albanians, and stopped the inflow of arms to the Albanians, in early September 1912.

Balkan Wars 

In the beginning of the First Balkan War, the Ottoman army was supported by some Albanian volunteers and irregulars; the Ottoman authorities supplied Boletini's men with 65,000 rifles and to protect Albanian lands within the empire he fought by their side which disappointed Serbia. It was reported in the Serbian press that during the surrender of Albanian rebels at Lumë on 16 November 1912, that Boletini and his men had managed to escape. The following historical account of events (uncorroborated by any other researcher of Albanian origin or otherwise) is from Isa Blumi, a researcher on Turkish Studies, based in Sweden. On 28 November 1912 in Vlora the Albanian National Assembly proclaimed independence. Ismail Qemali refused to wait for Boletini and other Albanian leaders of the Kosovo Vilayet and hastily made the declaration. The southern elite wanted to prevent Boletini's plans to assert himself as a key political figure and used him to suite their military needs.

Boletini contributed in the protection of Vlora government, while later was part of the Albanian delegation to the London Conference (1913) together with Ismail Qemali, Albanian head of government. The Albanian delegation wanted a Kosovo within the borders of the newly founded state of Albania, however the Great Powers said no and ceded the region to Serbia.

In 1913, Boletini and Bajram Curri commanded rebels against the Serbian and Montenegrin armies. On 13 August 1913, an outbreak of hostilities took place on the Serbian-Albanian frontier. A tenacious Albanian band of fighters under the command of Boletini, now Minister for War in the Provisional Government, made a successful attack on the frontier town of Debar and captured it from the small Serbian garrison, which had to retire after suffering severe losses.

On 23 September 1913, the dissatisfaction of the Albanian population at finding themselves under Serbian rule led to an uprising in Macedonia of Albanian patriots who refused to accept the decision of the Ambassadors Conference on the Albanian borders. The Albanian government organised armed resistance to recover the lost areas and 6,000 Albanians under the command of Boletini, the Minister of War, crossed the frontier. After an engagement with the Serbians the forces retook Debar and then marched, together with a Bulgarian band led by Petar Chaoulev, in the direction of Ohrid, but another band was checked with loss at Mavrovo. Within a few days they captured the towns of Gostivar, Struga and Ohrid, expelling the Serbian troops. At Ohrid they set up a local government and held the hills towards Resen for four days.

1914 

During the pro-Ottoman Muslim peasant uprising in central Albania which broke out in mid-May 1914, Isa Boletini and his troops defended Prince Wilhelm zu Wied.

When the revolt deteriorated in June 1914, Boletini and his men, mostly from Kosovo, joined the Dutch International Gendarmerie in their fight against the pro-Ottoman rebels.

World War I 

During World War I, Boletini commanded guerrilla fighters against the Montenegrin and Serbian armies.

On 20 October 1914, 1,000 Albanians, led by Bajram Curri, Boletini, Bulgarian komite and Austrian officers, attacked a Montenegrin base near Djakovica, and took two hill artillery pieces with them. The Montenegrin army then surrounded and defeated them, and pushed them into Albanian territory.

On 23 June 1915, after Montenegrin forces entered Scutari, Boletini and his men laid down their weapons and surrendered, traveling to Cetinje.

Flag of Isa Boletini

The flag of Isa Boletini was used for the first time at the Assembly of Isniq in 1910. It was later raised on top of a hill in Visekovc and on 12 August 1912, Boletini with thirty of his men, carried it through the streets of Skopje, which at the time was part of the Vilayet of Kosovo. 
The same flag was used in Vlorë, when Boletini and a cavalry of four hundred fighters entered the city on the day Albania declared its independence.

Legacy 
Boletini was tall, well-built, and strong, with great reputation, whose deeds of bravery and escapes from Turks and Serbs had become legends in Albania. He was noted for always wearing the traditional Albanian white cap (qeleshe) and national dress. He is considered one of Albania's greatest patriots and heroes. His ideas influenced the likes of Midhat Frashëri and prominent Albanian nationalists.

During the airplane meeting in Podgorica on 24 June 1934, pilot Tadija Sondermajer wore a Montenegrin dress and the flintlock of Boletini.

In 2010, Fatmir Sejdiu, the president of the Republic of Kosova, awarded him the highest order, "Hero of Kosovo", along with Azem Galica, Shote Galica, Hasan Prishtina, and Bajram Curri.
 
A statue of him was uncovered in Southern Mitrovica on the 100th anniversary of the Independence of Albania and Flag Day (28 November 2012).

During the abandoned Serbia v Albania (UEFA Euro 2016 qualifying) match, on 14 October 2014, while the game was suspended, a small remote-controlled quadcopter drone with a flag suspended from it hovered over the stadium. The flag showed the faces of  Ismail Qemali and Isa Boletini and a map of a Greater Albania.

Boletini was killed in a fight in Montenegro in 1916 and buried in the capital Podgorica. In 1998, his remains were exhumed and brought to Mitrovica, where they were kept in the town's mosque. They were removed in 2011, largely for security reasons in Kosovo's troubled north, and sent to the department of forensics in Pristina, where they were kept until 2015. A decision to rebury Boletini in Vlore the city in which Albanian independence was proclaimed, made by Kosovo Foreign Minister Hashim Thaci and Albanian Prime Minister Edi Rama, sparked negative reactions among Kosovo Albanians. The Boletini family first agreed to a reburial in Vlore but then refused. On 10 June 2015, Boletini was reburied at a ceremony in the village of Boletin. Hundreds of people attended the reburial which followed a public tribute at Mitrovica's football stadium. The honouring of Boletini was condemned by Serb minority MPs in Kosovo, who boycotted parliamentary session, calling it a provocation.

The Isa Boletini Monument is a heroic statue of Boletini in Shkodër, in northwestern Albania.

Quotes 
"When the spring comes, we will manure the plains of Kosovo with the bones of Serbs, for we Albanians have suffered too much to forget", 1913.
When Sir Edward Grey met Boletini in London at the British Foreign Office after having his pistol belt's ammunition removed, he uttered: "General, the newspapers might record tomorrow that Boletini, whom even Mahmut Shefqet Pasha could not disarm, was just disarmed in London.", upon which Boletini replied "No, no, not in London either.", he then withdrew a second pistol from his pocket.

Notes

References

Sources

Further reading 

 Bogumil Hrabak, "Arbanaški prvak Isa Boletinac i Crna Gora 1910-1912. godine,"/Z, XXX, Knj. XXXIV, No. 1 (1977): 177-92

External links 

1864 births
1916 deaths
Kosovo Albanians
Activists of the Albanian National Awakening
Albanian nationalists in Kosovo
19th-century Albanian people
20th-century Albanian people
Albanian military personnel
20th-century Albanian military personnel
20th-century people from the Ottoman Empire
People from Kosovo vilayet
Albanians from the Ottoman Empire
People from Zvečan
Kosovan Muslims
Shala (tribe)
All-Albanian Congress delegates
Heroes of Albania
Military personnel from Mitrovica, Kosovo